John Hubert (born February 24, 1991) is a running back that played for the Kansas State Wildcats.

College career
As a freshman, Hubert redshirted during the 2009 season. In 2010, he was the backup to Daniel Thomas along with William Powell. Hubert received very limited playing time, rushing for 28 yards (1).

As a sophomore, Hubert won the starting running back position from Bryce Brown and Angelo Pease. In his first start against Eastern Kentucky, Hubert rushed 17 times for 91 yards. Against Miami, he ran for a career high of 166 yards. Hubert would go on to carry the ball 200 times for a total of 970 yards and catch 24 passes for 188 yards.

As a junior, Hubert maintained his starting position. He rushed 189 times for 947 yards (1).

References
(1) http://espn.go.com/college-football/player/_/id/481493/john-hubert

(2) http://www.kstatesports.com/sports/m-footbl/mtt/john_hubert_703685.html

American football running backs
1991 births
Living people
Sportspeople from Waco, Texas
Players of American football from Texas
Kansas State Wildcats football players